Interboogieology is an album by David Murray released on the Italian Black Saint label in 1978. It features performances by Murray, cornetist Butch Morris, bassist Johnny Dyani and drummer Oliver Johnson. Marta Contreras sings on two tracks.

Reception
The Allmusic review by Scott Yanow awarded the album 3 stars, stating, "For this fairly early recording, avant-garde tenor saxophonist David Murray teams up with cornetist Butch Morris, bassist Johnny Dyani and drummer Oliver Johnson for some fairly free improvisations, with the originals written by either Murray or Morris. Two of the numbers also utilize the adventurous voice of Marta Contreras. The results are stimulating if not essential; a lesser but still interesting effort.".

Track listing
All compositions by David Murray except as indicated
 "Namthini's Shadow" (Butch Morris) - 8:18
 "Home" - 11:15
 "Blues for David" (Morris) - 9:45
 "Interboogieology" - 9:14
Recorded in February 1978 in Milano (Italy) at Ricordi Studios Engineer: Carlo Martenet

Personnel
David Murray - tenor saxophone
Butch Morris - cornet
Johnny Dyani - bass
Oliver Johnson - drums
Marta Contreras - vocals

References

1978 albums
David Murray (saxophonist) albums
Black Saint/Soul Note albums